Cypholomia is a genus of moths of the family Crambidae.

Species
Cypholomia amphiaula Meyrick, 1934
Cypholomia crypsibela Meyrick, 1934
Cypholomia drosocapna (Meyrick, 1933)
Cypholomia leptodeta Meyrick, 1933

References

Crambinae
Crambidae genera
Taxa named by Edward Meyrick